Voyage is an instrumental jazz duet album by American pianist Chick Corea and American flautist Steve Kujala, released in 1984 with ECM. The album marked a musical departure by Corea from the RTF jazz supergroup he formed in the 1970s.

Track listing

Personnel 
 Chick Corea – Composer, Keyboards, Liner Notes, Performer, Piano, Primary Artist
 Manfred Eicher – Producer
 Steve Kujala – Composer, Flute, Performer, Primary Artist
 Martin Wieland – Engineer
 Barbara Wojirsch – Design

References 

1985 albums
Chick Corea albums
ECM Records albums